Albert Lindsey Zobrist  (born February 27, 1942) is an American computer scientist, games researcher, and inventor of the famous Zobrist Hashing, which was published in 1970. He is further author of the first Go program in 1968 as part of his PhD Thesis on pattern recognition at the Computer Science Department of the University of Wisconsin.

Education 
Albert Zobrist received his Bachelor of Science in Mathematics at the Massachusetts Institute of Technology and a Masters in Mathematics and PhD in Computer Science from the University of Wisconsin–Madison.

Computer chess 
While affiliated with the University of Southern California and the Jet Propulsion Laboratory, Zobrist researched on computer chess, and was along with Frederic Roy Carlson and Charles Kalme co-author of the chess programs USC CP and Tyro, participating at the ACM North American Computer Chess Championships (NACCC) in 1977.

References

External links 

1942 births
Living people
Massachusetts Institute of Technology School of Science alumni
University of Wisconsin–Madison College of Letters and Science alumni
American computer scientists
Place of birth missing (living people)